Ralegaon Assembly constituency is one of the 288 constituencies of the Maharashtra Vidhan Sabha and one of the seven which are located in the Yavatmal district. It covers Ralegaon town and taluka and is reserved for a Scheduled Tribe candidate. Ralegaon, Kalamb and Babhulgaon taluka falls under Ralegaon assembly constituency.

It is a part of the Yavatmal-Washim (Lok Sabha constituency) with adjoining Washim district along with five other Vidhan Sabha assembly constituencies, viz. Washim Assembly constituency  , Karanja, Yavatmal(ST), Digras and Pusad.

Member of Legislative Assembly

Notes

Assembly constituencies of Maharashtra